SCH-51866 is a phosphodiesterase inhibitor.

References

Phosphodiesterase inhibitors
Trifluoromethyl compounds
Imidazoles
Cyclopentanes